The Hunter process was the first industrial process to produce pure ductile metallic titanium. It was invented in 1910 by Matthew A. Hunter, a chemist born in New Zealand who worked in the United States.  The process involves reducing titanium tetrachloride (TiCl4) with sodium (Na) in a batch reactor with an inert atmosphere at a temperature of 1,000°C. Dilute hydrochloric acid is then used to leach the salt from the product. 
TiCl4(g)  +  4 Na(l)   →   4 NaCl(l)  + Ti(s)

Prior to the Hunter process, all efforts to produce Ti metal afforded highly impure material, often titanium nitride (which resembles a metal). The Hunter process was used up until 1993 when it was replaced by the more economical Kroll process which was developed in the 1940s. In the Kroll process, TiCl4 is reduced by magnesium as opposed to sodium however both methods share the same steps to obtaining TiCl4 and today the Kroll process is among the most commonly used titanium smelting processes.

The Hunter process was conducted in either one or two steps. If a single step was used the reaction equation is as above, however, due to the larger amount of heat generated by the reduction using sodium as opposed to magnesium and the difficulty in controlling the vapor pressure of liquid sodium a two step process may instead be used. The two step processes consisted of reducing TiCl4 to TiCl2 with half the stoichiometric amount of sodium required to reduce TiCl4 to Ti. Next the TiCl2 in molten sodium chloride is transferred to a different container with the additional sodium required to form Ti. The two step processes proceeded according to the following two reactions:

TiCl4(g) + 2Na(l) → TiCl2(l, in NaCl) + 2NaCl(l)

TiCl2(l, in NaCl) + 2Na(l) → Ti(s) + 2NaCl(l)

Compared with the Kroll process the titanium produced by the Hunter process adheres to the reduction container walls less. Also the contamination by iron and other elements is also relatively low. The titanium produced by the Hunter process is in the form of powder called sponge fines. This form is useful and is an inexpensive raw material in powder metallurgy.

The main limiting factor for the usefulness of the Hunter process is the difficulty of separating the produced NaCl from the titanium. The vapor pressure of NaCl produced in the Hunter process is lower than the vapor pressure of MgCl2 which is produced by the Kroll process. Thus it is difficult to separate the NaCl from the titanium using distillation in an efficient manner. Therefore the NaCl is removed by leaching in an aqueous solution. Recovering the byproduct (NaCl) from this aqueous solution is a process that requires additional energy. These issues motivated the discontinuation of the Hunter process in industry in 1993, however, R&D into sodium reduction continues to this day due to the superior form and purity of the metal deposit produced when compared with the Kroll process.

References

Industrial processes
Titanium